Thomas Hochstrasser (born 13 July 1976) is a Swiss cyclist. He competed in the men's cross-country mountain biking event at the 2000 Summer Olympics.

References

External links
 

1976 births
Living people
Swiss male cyclists
Olympic cyclists of Switzerland
Cyclists at the 2000 Summer Olympics
Place of birth missing (living people)
Swiss mountain bikers